The 2011–12 season was Budapest Honvéd FC's 101st competitive season, 7th consecutive season in the OTP Bank Liga and 102nd year in existence as a football club.

First team squad

Transfers

Summer

In:

Out:

Winter

In:

Out:

List of Hungarian football transfer summer 2011
List of Hungarian football transfers winter 2011–12

Statistics

Appearances and goals
Last updated on 27 May 2012.

|-
|colspan="14"|Players currently out on loan

|-
|colspan="14"|Youth players

|-
|colspan="14"|Players no longer at the club

|}

Top scorers
Includes all competitive matches. The list is sorted by shirt number when total goals are equal.

Last updated on 27 May 2012

Disciplinary record
Includes all competitive matches. Players with 1 card or more included only.

Last updated on 27 May 2012

Overall
{|class="wikitable"
|-
|Games played || 37 (30 OTP Bank Liga, 1 Hungarian Cup and 6 Hungarian League Cup)
|-
|Games won || 15 (13 OTP Bank Liga, 0 Hungarian Cup and 2 Hungarian League Cup)
|-
|Games drawn || 8 (7 OTP Bank Liga, 0 Hungarian Cup and 1 Hungarian League Cup)
|-
|Games lost || 14 (10 OTP Bank Liga, 1 Hungarian Cup and 3 Hungarian League Cup)
|-
|Goals scored || 57
|-
|Goals conceded || 50
|-
|Goal difference || +7
|-
|Yellow cards || 89
|-
|Red cards || 6
|-
|rowspan="1"|Worst discipline ||  Ivan Lovrić (12 , 0 )
|-
|rowspan="2"|Best result || 4–0 (H) v Vasas SC – OTP Bank Liga – 30-07-2011
|-
| 4–0 (H) v Zalaegerszegi TE – OTP Bank Liga – 07-08-2011
|-
|rowspan="3"|Worst result || 0–3 (A) v Gyirmót SE – Ligakupa – 31-08-2011
|-
| 1–4 (H) v Kecskeméti TE – OTP Bank Liga – 23-03-2012
|-
| 0–3 (H) v Debreceni VSC – OTP Bank Liga – 20-05-2012
|-
|rowspan="1"|Most appearances ||  Ivan Lovrić (34 appearances)
|-
|rowspan="1"|Top scorer ||  Danilo (15 goal)
|-
|Points || 53/111 (47.75%)
|-

OTP Bank Liga

Matches

Classification

Results summary

Results by round

Hungarian Cup

League Cup

Matches

Classification

Pre Season (Winter)

References

External links
 Eufo
 Official Website
 UEFA
 fixtures and results

Budapest Honvéd FC seasons
Budapest Honved